The Amuca tribe is one of the nomadic Yörüks who belong to the Oghuz Turks tribes  of the Ottoman Empire, which moved from Anatolia to the Balkans. At the end of 14th century, the tribe established a settled life in Ottoman Thrace. The first village they founded, was Keşirlik, located in the Mahya Dağı.

Today some of the Amuca tribe live in Kırklareli Province.

References

History of the Turkish people
Oghuz Turks
Turkic peoples of Europe